Xapamopa is a genus of moths belonging to the subfamily Tortricinae of the family Tortricidae. It consists of only one species, Xapamopa oxapampa, which is found in Peru.

The wingspan is about 18 mm. The ground colour of the forewings is ochreous cream, reticulated with brown. The markings are brown with ochreous spots. The hindwings are pale ochreous, reticulate brownish posteriorly.

Etymology
The generic name is an anagram of the name of the type species. The specific name refers to the name of the type locality.

See also
List of Tortricidae genera

References

Euliini